The A1 Team Austria was the Austrian representative team in A1 Grand Prix. The team competed only in the inaugural season of the championship.

Ownership
A1 Team Austria was owned and operated by Lauda Motorsport Management. The management team included Niki Lauda and Keke Rosberg, both former Formula 1 World Champions. Whilst the team was racing for Austria, Team Rosberg, based in Germany operated the race team. Lauda's son, Lukas, officially ran Lauda Motorsport Management who worked with other teams such as Scuderia Coloni. Their entry to the championship was announced ahead of the first race, along with A1 Team Italy and A1 Team Japan.

Ahead of the 2006-07 season, A1 Team Austria withdrew from A1 Grand Prix along with Japan, Russia and Portugal.

Drivers
During their one season in the championship, the A1 Team Austria employed Mathias Lauda and Patrick Friesacher as their drivers.

2005-06 season

The season began poorly for A1 Team Austria, with no points scored until the 3rd round in Portugal, where Lauda finished 10th in the feature race meaning a single point was gained. At the following two rounds, the car would suffer retirements in both sprint races. In Dubai, Lauda finished 7th in the feature race scoring 4 points for the team. He would score another 7th place finish at the South African race, next time out.

Lauda would be replaced for the Mexican race by former Minardi F1 driver, Patrick Friesacher. Friesacher would finish 10th and 9th in the two races, A1 Team Austria's first double points scoring race weekend. Lauda would return for the final two rounds of the season in America and China, scoring points at Laguna Seca.

At the end of the season, A1 Team Austria scored 14 points and were classified 19th in the championship.

Complete A1 Grand Prix results

(key), "spr" indicate a Sprint Race, "fea" indicate a Main Race.

References

External links
A1gp.com Official A1 Grand Prix Web Site

Austria A1 team
Austrian auto racing teams
National sports teams of Austria
Auto racing teams established in 2005
Auto racing teams disestablished in 2006